Ikere-Ekiti, also known as Ikere or Ikerre, is a city in Ekiti State of Nigeria.In Ikere Local Government. It is an agricultural and mine centre. According to the 1963 and 1991 census, the population was 114,780 and 60,257 respectively,

but the 2006 census recorded it to be 147,355.

References

Local Government Areas in Ekiti State
Towns in Yorubaland